Market and Sanchez station is a light rail station in San Francisco, California, United States, serving the San Francisco Municipal Railway F Market & Wharves heritage railway line. It is located on Market Street at the intersections of 15th Street and Sanchez Street.

In 2022, new decorative railings were added on both boarding islands as part of the Upper Market Street Safety Project. They feature a quote from Harvey Milk's 1977 "You've Got to Have Hope" speech, as well as an illustration of streetcar #1051, which is dedicated in Milk's honor.

References 

San Francisco Municipal Railway streetcar stations